John N. Oswalt is an American scholar and distinguished professor of Old Testament at Asbury Theological Seminary. He teaches in theology, Old Testament and ancient semitic languages including Hebrew. He is the author of 11 scholarly books; foremost is the 2-volume commentary on the Book of Isaiah in the New International Commentary on the Old Testament series. Exodus: The Way Out (2013) is a recent work. Oswalt adheres to single, unitary authorship of the Book of Isaiah. Numerous scholarly journals, biblical encyclopedias and academic religious periodicals have included articles by him.

Education
Oswalt earned his B.A. at Taylor University. He further earned a B.D. and Th.M. from Asbury Theological Seminary and a M.A. and Ph.D. from Brandeis University.

History and Career
Oswalt is an ordained minister in the United Methodist Church.

Isaiah 
Most Scholars believe that Isaiah had multiple authors, which John N. Oswalt disputes. He argued that the source of all the chapters in the book of Isaiah are from Isaiah, though the book could have been assembled over the years from his collected works. He wrote that in the Dead Sea Scrolls, Isaiah is a single scroll with no signs of change between chapters 39 and 40. Also as far as we know the book has always existed in one collection called "Isaiah".I'm not at all sure that Isaiah himself wrote the book as we have it. However, I do believe that all that is in the book originated with Isaiah and probably that his disciples then were the ones who collected what he said and commented on and put it in its present form.” —Dr. John Oswalt

Selected works
Oswalt's books and articles include:

Books

Articles

References

External links
John H. Oswalt Asbury Faculty Page

Living people
Arminian ministers
Arminian theologians

Asbury Theological Seminary faculty
Trinity International University faculty
Taylor University alumni
Asbury Theological Seminary alumni
Brandeis University alumni
American Methodist clergy
1940 births